Eupithecia vitiosata is a moth in the family Geometridae first described by Vladimir Mironov in 2001. It is found in Russia (East & West Causcasia).

References

Moths described in 2001
vitiosata
Moths of Europe